Judah Dana (April 25, 1772 – December 27, 1845) was an American lawyer, judge and politician. He served as a United States senator from Maine and as Judge of the Maine Court of Common Pleas during the early 1800s.

Early life
Born in Pomfret, Vermont, Dana was the son of John Winchester and Hannah (Putnam) Dana. He graduated from Dartmouth College in 1795 and then studied law. In 1798, he was admitted to the bar and began the practice of law in Fryeburg, Maine, which was then a part of Massachusetts.

Career
Dana served as the district attorney for Oxford County, Maine from 1805-1811, and as judge of probate for Oxford County from 1811-1822. From 1811-1823, he was judge of the Court of Common Pleas. He was also a judge of the circuit court.

In 1819, Dana was a delegate to the convention that framed the state constitution of Maine, and was a trustee for Bowdoin College from 1820-1843. He was a bank commissioner from 1836-1837. In 1833, he was elected a member of the Governor's Council for Governor Samuel E. Smith., serving in 1834.

An adherent of the Jacksonian Party, Dana was appointed United States Senator upon the resignation of Ether Shepley when Shepley became Judge of the Maine Supreme Judicial Court. Dana served as Senator from December 21, 1836 to March 3, 1837, when a successor was elected and qualified.

Personal life
He married Elizabeth Ripley in 1800 and they had eight children: Caroline Elizabeth Dana, Maria Annette Dana, John Winchester Dana, Francis Putnaman Dana, Abigail Ripley Dana, Catherine Putnam Dana, Emily Wheelock Dana, and Sarah Malleville Dana. Their son John became Governor of Maine. After Elizabeth's death in 1819, Dana married Mehitable Osgood Mcmillan.

Dana was the grandson (on his mother's side) of the American Revolutionary War General Israel Putnam.

Death
Dana died in Fryeburg, Oxford County, Maine, on December 27, 1845 (age 73 years, 246 days). He is interred at Village Cemetery in Fryeburg, Maine.

References

Further reading
 "The School and College Life of Judah Dana of the Class of 1795" by James A. Spalding, published by Dartmouth Alumni Magazine in February 1917.

External links
 
 
 Biographical Directory of the United States Congress

1772 births
1845 deaths
People from Pomfret, Vermont
American people of English descent
Jacksonian United States senators from Maine
Democratic Party United States senators from Maine
Maine Jacksonians
People from Fryeburg, Maine
Dartmouth College alumni